Justin De Witt Bowersock (September 19, 1842 – October 27, 1922) was a U.S. Representative from Kansas.

Early life
Justin De Witt Bowersick was born on September 19, 1942, near Columbiana, Ohio, Bowersock moved to Iowa City, Iowa, in 1860 and engaged in mercantile pursuits and grain shipping. He moved to Lawrence, Kansas, in 1877 and engaged in banking and in the manufacture of flour, paper, and barbed wire. He served as mayor of Lawrence from 1881 to 1885. Bowersock was elected to the Kansas House of Representatives in 1887. He served as a member of the Kansas State Senate in 1895.

Bowersock was elected as a Republican to the Fifty-sixth and to the three succeeding Congresses (March 4, 1899 – March 3, 1907). He was not a candidate for renomination in 1906. He was interested in banking and manufactures in Lawrence, Kansas, until his death there on October 27, 1922. He was interred in Oak Hill Cemetery in Lawrence.

References

1842 births
1922 deaths
Republican Party members of the Kansas House of Representatives
Republican Party Kansas state senators
Republican Party members of the United States House of Representatives from Kansas